Castejón de Sos, in Benasquese: Castilló de Sos, is a municipality located in the province of Huesca, Aragon, Spain. According to the 2004 census (INE), the municipality had a population of 731 inhabitants.

References

External links

Municipalities in the Province of Huesca